Günther Johannes Jauch (born 13 July 1956) is a German television presenter, television producer, and journalist.

Career 
Jauch is known for a unique style of informing and entertaining people that is generally considered witty and funny. He won several awards for his appearances in German television. Jauch also owns the production company "i&u TV", which stands for Information und Unterhaltung ("information and entertainment"). He is known to make large donations to charity from money he receives from his appearances in advertisements and other promotional work.

Jauch has used his personal wealth to purchase and restore several historic buildings in and around Potsdam, his current town of residence.

In the 1980s, Jauch worked for radio programs of Bayerischer Rundfunk. Jauch has produced and hosted the prime time TV programme , a television news magazine programme, on the private German  RTL national TV network since 1990. The programme caused some sensation due to the transmission of falsified articles delivered by the journalist Michael Born who was subsequently convicted to a four-year prison sentence in 1996, a few other prominent German TV networks had also been deceived with such material. In January 2011, after celebrating the end of his 21-year reign hosting , Jauch will now host a weekly political talkshow on the national German public TV network Das Erste ("The First").

In 2005, Jauch was named by Stern magazine the most famous German in the world. In late 2006, Jauch announced that he would only host the first broadcast of the Four Hills Tournament (from Oberstdorf) and celebrate New Year's Eve with his family. Jauch had hosted all events of the Four Hills Tournament since 2000. The 2007 season tournaments from Garmisch-Partenkirchen, Innsbruck and Bischofshofen were hosted by Marco Schreyl instead.

Jauch, together with Thomas Gottschalk, is also part of the German TV show Die 2 – Gottschalk und Jauch gegen alle.

In 2015, shortly after Stefan Raab announced the end of his TV career, Jauch declared publicly that he intended to gradually reduce his TV appearances; stating that he will eventually give up his political talk show Günther Jauch on ARD and to focus on his other TV shows such as Wer wird Millionär? on RTL.

Personal life
After 18 years of common-law marriage, Jauch married Thea in the Orangerie at Schloss Sanssouci in Potsdam in 2006. He is a member of the Hamburg Jauch family.

Jauch and Thea have two biological daughters, Svenja (born in 1989) and Kristin (born in 1993). The couple adopted two orphaned daughters in 1997 and 2000, named Katja and Masha.

Philanthropy

Jauch is characterised by his secluded lifestyle. He stated in interviews that he takes the liberty of leading a life that does not correspond to his supposed economic possibilities. According to his own statement, he has spent considerable amounts of his income, including all the profit from advertising jobs, on charitable causes since the early years of his career. In 2002, he made significant financial contributions to the reconstruction of the Fortunaportal (Gate of the Fortuna) at the Potsdam Stadtschloss city palace. Jauch has also given financial support to other projects in Potsdam, e.g. the Belvedere on the Pfingstberg, (where he got married in 2006), the Potsdam city canal, the Kloebersaal, a hall in the north wing of the Marmorpalais (Marble Palace), which is opposite his villa at Heiligen See lake, as well as the restoration of the Neptungrotte (Neptune Grotto) in the palace gardens of Schloss Sanssouci. Furthermore, he supported the construction of the Marienschule Potsdam, a co-educational Roman-Catholic school for primary and secondary education, which belongs to the archdiocese of Berlin. The prime minister of Brandenburg, Matthias Platzeck, called him a citizen every mayor could ever wish for. Jauch was an ambassador for the Berlin Pro-Reli-Kampagne, a petition which aimed to change the Education Act of the state of Berlin in order to introduce religious studies as an elective subject instead of ethics as a sole compulsory subject. The campaign eventually failed in April 2009.

Jauch's ancestress on his grandmother's side, Anna Weißebach, founded the Caritas Konferenzen, the German branch of the International Association of Charities. Jauch's own family set up soup kitchens in Hamburg as early as the 19th and 20th century and founded and maintained poorhouses in Hamburg and other places. In line with his family's tradition of charitable foundations, Jauch endowed the founding of a branch of Die Arche in Drewitz (Potsdam) in 2009, which provides free meals for children in need. He also covers ongoing property and personnel expenses. Die Arche – Christliches Kinder- und Jugendwerk e.V. is a Christian organisation for children and adolescents.

Vineyard owner
Jauch also continues a 200 year-old family tradition of wine-growing. In 2010, he successfully applied for membership in the German Prädikat Wine Estates VDP (German: "Verband Deutscher Prädikatsweingüter"), in order to acquire a relative's vineyard (Othegraven in Kanzem) which was approved by VDP that certifies Germany's wines that meet the organizations requirements. The entire property, including a mansion and an English Garden, has been subject to preservation orders since 2003.

Jauch's family has been running the winery since 1805, when his ancestor and merchant Emmerich Grach bought the property. Jauch's grandmother Elsa von Othegraven, his grandfather Hans Jauch and his father Ernst-Alfred Jauch were part of the community of heirs. However, in 1996 the winery was inherited by a distant relative.

In order to ensure that the winery was not going to be sold to a party outside the family, Jauch decided to buy it. One of the previous owners had been Jauch's famous great-great-uncle, Franz Weißebach. According to the VDP, the vineyard is a gem of a vineyard, rare in its quality and attractive location. In 2011, Jauch acquired a further vineyard (Wawerner Herrenberg) in Wawern that is 3.5 acres. It had also belonged to his ancestor Emmerich Grach. Jauch also co-produced wines that supermarket chain Aldi has been selling under his name since 2018.

Dispute about privacy
Jauch wanted to legally prohibit any type of media coverage in the preparation of his wedding in July 2006. The Landgericht Berlin granted him an interim injunction against the newspaper Bild and other publications of the Springer publishing house. The Kammergericht Berlin, however, decided against a prohibition of general media coverage in June 2006 due to his celebrity status. According to the judges, they were allowed to report about the date and place of the wedding. After the magazine Bunte published photos of the wedding and details about the ceremony, Thea Jauch went to court against the publishing house to demand damages and compensation for pain and suffering totalling 325,000 Euros. The Landgericht Hamburg awarded her only 25,000 Euros compensation in January 2008. The judgment was set aside by the Hanseatisches Oberlandesgericht in October 2008. As a public figure, interest in Jauch's wedding was legitimate, it said. An anew appeal was refused by the Federal Constitutional Court. The demand for damages by Jauch in a separate lawsuit was in vain as well.

The couple then went before the European Court of Human Rights to claim that the German justice system did not protect Jauch's right to privacy sufficiently and breached his right to protection of property, because they did not award him damages for the published photos. The court in Strasbourg affirmed the public's interest in his wedding and therefore, their claims were without cause. German justice had carefully weighed between the right to privacy and the freedom of the press, it said. The complaint was declared inadmissible.

Shows hosted 
 1985–1987: Live aus dem Alabama
 1988–1997: Das aktuelle sportstudio (Up-to-date Sport news)
 since 1989: Menschen, Bilder, Emotionen (People, Pictures, Emotions)
 1990–2010: Stern TV
 since 1999: Wer wird Millionär? (German version of Who Wants to Be a Millionaire?)
 2000–2006: RTL-Skispringen (ski jumping)
 2001–2004: Der Große IQ-Test (The Big IQ Test)
 2001–2009: 5-Millionen SKL Show
 2002–2004: Grips-Show (Brain Show)
 since 2009: 5 gegen Jauch (5 against Jauch)
 2011–2015: Günther Jauch (Sunday evening political talkshow on Das Erste)
 2013–2017: Die 2 – Gottschalk & Jauch gegen alle (with Thomas Gottschalk and Barbara Schöneberger)
 2016–2017: 500 – Die Quiz-Arena
 since 2018: Denn sie wissen nicht, was passiert – Die Jauch-Gottschalk-Schöneberger-Show (with Thomas Gottschalk and Barbara Schöneberger)
 since 2019: Bin ich schlauer als Günther Jauch? (Am I smarter than Günther Jauch?)

Awards
 1988
 Goldene Kamera
 1989
 Bayerischer Fernsehpreis 
 1990
 Bambi
 1998
 Bayerischer Fernsehpreis together with Marcel Reif
 2001
 Goldene Kamera
 Bayerischer Fernsehpreis: 
 Bambi for Wer wird Millionär?
 2002
 Adolf-Grimme-Preis
 2003
 Unsere Besten, Rank 29
 Osgar
 Bambi: 
 2006
 Deutscher Fernsehpreis 
 2010
 Deutscher Fernsehpreis
 2011
 Goldene Kamera 
 red dot design award 
 2012
 Goldene Kamera

Products advertised 
 Krombacher (beer)
 KarstadtQuelle (a department store / mail-order company)
  (a lottery)
 DHL (a postal service owned by Germany's Deutsche Post alongside Thomas Gottschalk)
 World Wide Fund for Nature (a nature preserve organization)

References in popular culture 
 Jauch is mentioned in the song Rot by Markus Henrik, in his role as the host of the show Wer wird Millionär? (Who Wants to Be a Millionaire?).
 Jauch is also mentioned in the Blumentopf song "Warum eigentlich nicht?"

See also 
 List of celebrities who own wineries and vineyards

References

External links

 Günther Jauch on IMDb
 Literature from and about Günther Jauch in the German National Library

1956 births
Living people
German television personalities
German game show hosts
German television talk show hosts
German sports journalists
German sports broadcasters
Male journalists
20th-century German journalists
21st-century German journalists
German journalists
German male journalists
People from Münster
People from Potsdam
German Roman Catholics
Gunther
RTL Group people
ARD (broadcaster) people
ZDF people
Bayerischer Rundfunk people
Who Wants to Be a Millionaire?